"Look What You've Done to Me" is a 1980 song recorded by Boz Scaggs, composed by Scaggs and David Foster for the movie Urban Cowboy. It reached #14 on the U.S. Billboard Hot 100 in November, #13 on the Cash Box Top 100, reached #30 in Canada and went to #3 on the US Adult Contemporary chart. The song reflects on a broken romance as depicted in the film.

Background
The song features the Eagles on background vocals and instrumentation by Don Felder on guitar and members of Toto and David Foster on keyboards.  Two versions of the song were released.  The more widely available version of the song (as released on Scaggs greatest hits compilations) places more emphasis on the Eagles' background vocals, plus additional background vocal stylings by Scaggs towards the end of the song.  The version as heard in the Urban Cowboy film (as well as its soundtrack) replaces the Eagles' vocals with a female chorus.

According to comments made by both Scaggs and Foster on the television special (and subsequent DVD) Hit Man: David Foster and Friends, the song was written and recorded in one night after the studio called asking the duo to write a song for the scene, informing them the scene was to be filmed the following day, and the track needed to be on a courier plane the following morning.

David Foster provided a bit more of the backstory on The Real Housewives of Beverly Hills, Season 3, Episode 3, titled "Don't Sing For Your Supper,” as his then-wife Yolanda was a cast member. Foster said that Scaggs wasn't happy with any of the music he played that evening until the night was almost over. When Foster played the intro chords that became the trademark beginning of the song, Scaggs said, "That's it.”

Chart performance

Weekly charts

Year-end charts

Personnel 
Original version musicians
Boz Scaggs – lead vocals
David Foster – keyboards, string and horn arrangements
Steve Lukather, Don Felder – guitar
Mike Porcaro – bass guitar
Jeff Porcaro – drums
Glenn Frey, Don Henley, Timothy B. Schmit – background vocals

Urban Cowboy version musicians
Boz Scaggs – lead vocals
David Foster – keyboards, string arrangements
Steve Lukather – guitar
Mike Porcaro – bass guitar
Jeff Porcaro – drums
Venetta Fields, Paulette Brown, Julia Tillman Waters, Oren Waters - background vocals

References

1980 singles
Boz Scaggs songs
Songs written by David Foster
Songs written by Boz Scaggs
Columbia Records singles
Songs written for films
1980 songs
Rock ballads
1980s ballads